Mattia Dalla Torre (born 29 September 1996) is an Italian figure skater. He has won three senior international medals – gold at the 2017 Skate Helena, silver at the 2018 Sofia Trophy, and silver at the 2018 Egna Spring Trophy.

Programs

Competitive highlights 
CS: Challenger Series; JGP: Junior Grand Prix

Ice dancing with Leccardi

Men's singles

References

External links 
 

1996 births
Italian male single skaters
Living people
People from Borgo Valsugana
Competitors at the 2019 Winter Universiade
Sportspeople from Trentino